My Larsen (born 9 February 1999 as My Hollinger, also known as My Hollinger Larsen) is a Danish female curler from Hvidovre.

Personal life
Larsen works as a kindergarten assistant.

Teams

Women's

Mixed

References

External links

Larsen, My Hollinger | Nordic Junior Curling Tour

Living people
1999 births
Danish female curlers

People from Gentofte Municipality
People from Hvidovre Municipality
Curlers at the 2022 Winter Olympics
Olympic curlers of Denmark
Sportspeople from the Capital Region of Denmark
21st-century Danish women